Jacob "Jaap" Boot (1 March 1903 in Wormerveer – 14 June 1986 in Dordrecht) was a Dutch athlete who competed mainly in the 100 metres and the long jump.

He competed for the Netherlands in the 1924 Summer Olympics held in Paris, France in the 4 x 100 metre relay where he won the bronze medal with his team mates Jan de Vries, Harry Broos and Marinus van den Berge. He also took part in the long jump event, but was eliminated in the series.

Boot was a Dutch national champion in the long jump in 1923, 1924, 1932 and 1933.

References

External links
databaseolympics.com

1903 births
1986 deaths
Dutch male long jumpers
Dutch male sprinters
Olympic athletes of the Netherlands
Olympic bronze medalists for the Netherlands
Athletes (track and field) at the 1924 Summer Olympics
Sportspeople from Zaanstad
Medalists at the 1924 Summer Olympics
Olympic bronze medalists in athletics (track and field)
20th-century Dutch people